In geometry, a strophoid is a curve generated from a given curve  and points  (the fixed point) and  (the pole) as follows: Let  be a variable line passing through  and intersecting  at .

If, in addition,  is perpendicular to  then the curve is called a right strophoid, or simply strophoid by some authors. The right strophoid is also called the logocyclic curve or foliate.

Equations

Polar coordinates
Let the curve  be given by  where the origin is taken to be . Let  be the point .

Therefore, the equation of the strophoid is given by

Cartesian coordinates
Let  be the point  and let  be the point . Then, by a straightforward application of the polar formula, the strophoid is given parametrically by:

where

An alternative polar formula
The complex nature of the formulas given above limits their usefulness in specific cases. There is an alternative form which is sometimes simpler to apply.

Let  be the origin and  be the point . Suppose  can be given as a function , say  Let  be the angle at  so  We can determine  in terms of  using the law of sines. Since

 is a sectrix of Maclaurin with poles  and  when  is of the form  in that case  and  will have the same form so the strophoid is either another sectrix of Maclaurin or a pair of such curves.

Specific cases

Oblique strophoids
Let  be a line through . Then, in the notation used above,  where  is a constant.

and

It's easy to check that these equations describe the same curve.

In rectangular coordinates, with a change of constant parameters, this is

This is a cubic curve and, by the expression in polar coordinates it is rational.

The right strophoid

Putting  in

gives

The Cartesian equation is 

The curve resembles the Folium of Descartes and the line  is an asymptote to two branches. The curve has two more asymptotes, in the plane with complex coordinates, given by

Circles
Then, in the notation used above,  where  is a constant.

and

See also
Conchoid
Cissoid

References

External links

Curves